Binibining Pilipinas 2001 was the 38th edition of Binibining Pilipinas. It took place at the Smart Araneta Coliseum in Quezon City, Metro Manila, Philippines on March 10, 2001. It was supposedly scheduled on February 24, 2001, but it was moved to a later date.

At the end of the event, Nina Ricci Alagao crowned Zorayda Ruth Andam as Binibining Pilipinas Universe 2001. Katherine de Guzman crowned Gilrhea Quinzon as Binibining Pilipinas World 2001, while Joanna Maria Peñaloza crowned Maricarl Tolosa as Binibining Pilipinas International 2001. Michelle Reyes was named First Runner-Up, while Maricar Balagtas was named Second Runner-Up.

Later that year, Michelle Reyes was appointed as Binibining Pilipinas Tourism International 2001, while Maricar Balagtas was appointed as Binibining Pilipinas Globe International 2001.

Results

Color keys
  The contestant Won in an International pageant.
  The contestant did not place.

Special awards

Contestants
26 contestants competed for the three titles.

Notes

Post-pageant Notes 

 Zorayda Ruth Andam competed at Miss Universe 2001 in Bayamón, Puerto Rico, but was unplaced. She was the 1st Runner-Up in the Best in National Costume Award. She also competed at the Miss Tourism World 2001 pageant in Medellin, Colombia.
 Gilrhea Quinzon competed at Miss World 2001 in Sun City, South Africa but was unplaced. Maricarl Tolosa competed at Miss International 2001 in Tokyo, Japan, and was also unplaced.
 Michelle Reyes competed at Miss Tourism International 2001 and won Miss Tourism International 2001. In 2002, she competed at Miss Tourism World 2002 in Ankara, Turkey and won.
 Maricar Balagtas competed at Miss Globe International 2001 in Istanbul, Turkey and won Miss Globe International 2001. She also won the Best National Costume Award. She later joined at Binibining Pilipinas 2004 and was crowned as Binibining Pilipinas Universe 2004. She competed at Miss Universe 2004 in Quito, Ecuador but was unplaced.
 Precious Lara Quigaman competed at Binibining Pilipinas 2005 and was crowned as Binibining Pilipinas International 2005. She then competed at Miss International 2005 in Tokyo, Japan and won.

References

External links
 Official Pageant Website

2001
2001 in the Philippines
2001 beauty pageants